The Ballston Spa Stakes is a Grade II American Thoroughbred horse race for fillies and mares that are four years old or older over a distance of one and one-sixteenth miles on the turf course scheduled annually in late July or early August at Saratoga Race Course in Saratoga Springs, New York. The event currently carries a purse of $400,000.

History 

The inaugural running of the Ballston Spa Stakes was 4 August 1983 and was restricted to New York State bred fillies and mares that were three years old or older and run at a distance of 7 furlongs on the dirt. The name of the event honors Ballston Spa, New York, a small town just south of Saratoga Springs. The Ballston Spa name was not used again until 1997.

NYRA created a race in 1989 with Breeders' Cup incentives that was the forerunner of today's event. The event with additional sponsorship from Budweiser was known as the Aqueduct Budweiser Breeders' Cup Handicap and it was run in late October over a distance of one mile. In 1994 the event was moved to Saratoga and was renamed as the Saratoga Breeders' Cup Handicap with an increase of distance to  miles.

In 1995 the event was classified as Grade III and upgraded to Grade II in 2006.

In 1997 the event was renamed once more to the Ballston Spa Handicap.

The 2002 event was taken off the turf track due to consistent rain during the days before the event which resulted in seven scratchings leaving a small field of three to run. Surya won by the stakes largest distance of  lengths with over 50 lengths separating second and third on the muddy track.

Several champions have won this event including the 2004–05 Australian Champion Three Year Old Filly Alinghi, the 2006 US Champion Three-Year-Old Filly Wait A While, who was a dual winner of the event, the 2012 US Champion Female Turf Horse French bred Zagora who later that year would also win the Breeders' Cup Filly & Mare Turf and Lady Eli, US Champion Female Turf Horse in 2017.

Records
Speed  record: 
 miles: 1:38.77 – Strike Charmer (2016)
 1 mile: 1:33.80 – Wakonda (1989)

Margins:
  lengths – Surya (2002)

Most wins:
 2 – Weekend Madness (1994, 1995)
 2 – Wait A While (2007, 2008)

Most wins by an owner:
 2 – New Phoenix Stable (1994, 1995)
 2 – Arindel Farm (2007, 2008)

Most wins by a jockey:
 5 – John Velazquez (1997, 2003, 2004, 2007, 2008)

Most wins by a trainer:
 7 – Chad C. Brown (2012, 2015, 2017, 2018, 2019, 2021, 2022)

Winners 

Legend:

 
 

Notes:

§ Ran as an entry

‡ The inaugural event was restricted to New York State bred fillies and mares that are three years old or older.

See also
List of American and Canadian Graded races

References

Graded stakes races in the United States
Grade 2 stakes races in the United States
Mile category horse races for fillies and mares
Horse races in New York (state)
Turf races in the United States
Saratoga Race Course
Recurring sporting events established in 1983
1983 establishments in New York (state)